Laurel Mountain is a borough in Westmoreland County, Pennsylvania, United States.  The population was 185 at the 2000 census.  Located at the foot of Laurel Mountain (elev. 2,800 ft.), the borough lies near numerous limestone caves and is surrounded by venues for skiing, hiking, and other outdoor activities.

Geography
Laurel Mountain is located at  (40.211418, -79.184568). It is situated in the southern part of Ligonier Township.

Demographics

At the 2000 census there were 185 people, 78 households, and 56 families living in the borough. The population density was 1,347.4 people per square mile (510.2/km²). There were 109 housing units at an average density of 793.9 per square mile (300.6/km²).  The racial makeup of the borough was 100.00% White. Hispanic or Latino of any race were 1.62%.

Of the 78 households 26.9% had children under the age of 18 living with them, 61.5% were married couples living together, 6.4% had a female householder with no husband present, and 28.2% were non-families. 24.4% of households were one person and 11.5% were one person aged 65 or older. The average household size was 2.37 and the average family size was 2.80.

The age distribution was 19.5% under the age of 18, 5.9% from 18 to 24, 27.0% from 25 to 44, 25.4% from 45 to 64, and 22.2% 65 or older. The median age was 44 years. For every 100 females, there were 96.8 males. For every 100 females age 18 and over, there were 96.1 males.

The median household income was $44,750 and the median family income  was $63,125. Males had a median income of $51,250 versus $30,833 for females. The per capita income for the borough was $21,564. About 13.2% of families and 20.0% of the population were below the poverty line, including 36.4% of those under the age of eighteen and 6.5% of those sixty five or over.

References

Boroughs in Westmoreland County, Pennsylvania
Populated places established in 1926
Pittsburgh metropolitan area
1982 establishments in Pennsylvania